The University of World Economy and Diplomacy is located in Tashkent, the capital of Uzbekistan. It was founded on September 23, 1992, by the decree of the President Karimov to train future leaders of the country.

The University of World Economy and Diplomacy is a public institution which provides education that serves the interests of foreign policy of Uzbekistan and contributes to the development of society and the individual.
The university has a strong alumni network.

Academics
UWED has completed the transition to a comprehensive system of education, offering five-year degree program at the undergraduate as well as two-year master's degree program. The university maintains sufficient depth of scholarship to offer the doctorate in selected academic disciplines.

The training on the subjects of international relations, political science, global economy, and law is conducted by three departments, 22 chair departments, and eight centers and is given by 16 full professors, more than 70 holders of Doctor or Candidate of Sciences degrees, 55 associate professors and 87 qualified faculty members. Faculties for bachelor's degrees are International Economic Relations, international relations, and International law.

Sources
Faculty training

Source

See also 

TEAM University
Turin Polytechnic University in Tashkent
Inha University in Tashkent
Yeoju Technical Institute in Tashkent
Tashkent State Technical University
Tashkent Institute of Irrigation and Melioration
Tashkent Financial Institute
Moscow State University in Tashkent named M.V Lomonosov
Tashkent Automobile and Road Construction Institute
Tashkent State University of Economics
Tashkent State Agrarian University
Tashkent State University of Law
Tashkent University of Information Technologies
Westminster International University in Tashkent

References

Universities in Uzbekistan
Educational institutions established in 1992
1992 establishments in Uzbekistan